Tommy  is a 2015 Telugu-language drama film directed by Raja Vannem Reddy. This film is an adaptation of the real story of Hachiko. Produced by Babu Pictures, the film stars Rajendra Prasad and Seeta in lead roles with the music composed by Chakri.

The film received mixed reviews from critics. This film won Nandi Award for Akkineni Award for Best Home-viewing Feature Film and Rajendra Prasad also has garnered the Nandi Award for Best Character Actor for 2014 for the film.

Plot
Viswam Master (Rajendra Prasad) is a very famous professor in Bheemavaram. One day he comes across a dog in the railway station and decides to adopt it. Initially, his wife (Seeta) does not approve of it but later agrees to her husband's wish. The couple names the dog Tommy and very soon, the pet becomes a key member of the family. Satyam Master starts taking Tommy daily to the station and Tommy on his own goes to the station to greet him in the evening. Their bond of love becomes stronger every day. The twist in the tale arises when an untoward incident turns the entire family's life upside down. Suddenly one day, Tommy does not want Satyam Master to go to his duty and tries to stop him at home and at the station too. On the very same day he died due to heart attack, without ever returning to the train station in which Tommy is waiting. He cremated the next day. But Tommy is till waiting at the station and did not see his master for the last time and waiting for his return. After few days family moved to Australia to daughter's home. Even though lot of times it was taken to home by Viswam master's daughter, it returned to the station and waiting every day for Master's return. Like that it waited for 10 years and it died on the 10th death anniversary of his master, cherishing his memories with master for the last time.

Cast
 Rajendra Prasad as Viswam Master
 Seetha as Viswam Master's wife
 Suresh as Chandrasekhar 
 L. B. Sriram
 Raghu Babu
 Mumtaj
 Surya as Station Master
 Venu Madhav
 Deepak
 Geeta Singh
 Aalapati Lakshmi
 Dog(Tommy)

Production and music
The film was shot in 25 days.

Music composed by Chakri. Lyrics were written by Ananta Sriram. Music released on Murari Music Company.

Reception
The film was released on 13 March 2015 to received mixed reviews. The critics appreciated the story, brilliant performances and rich production elements while criticising its old-fashioned narration. 123Telugu rated the film 2.75/5 and wrote, "Tommy has an interesting premise and beautiful content. First half of the film is decent and holds the viewers attention. But it is the second half which misses out on the emotions."

Awards 

 2014: Nandi Awards - Best Character Actor - Rajendra Prasad - won
 2014: Nandi Award for Akkineni Award for Best Home-viewing Feature Film - Chegondi Hari Rama Jogaiah

References

External links
 

2015 films
2010s Telugu-language films
Films about dogs
Films scored by Chakri